Mithra de Silva Wettimuny (11 June 1951 – 20 January 2019) was a Sri Lankan cricketer who played in two Test matches and one One Day International (ODI) in 1983.

Family
Mithra Wettimuny was one of three brothers to represent Sri Lanka (all opening batsmen). His elder brother Sunil played in the 1975 and 1979 Cricket World Cups while his youngest brother Sidath scored Sri Lanka's first Test match hundred.

International career
Wettimuny originally came to prominence as captain of the successful Ceylon Schools team which toured India in 1969/70, a team which included future Test captains Bandula Warnapura and Duleep Mendis. Sri Lanka gained Test status in 1982, and by then in his early thirties, Wettimuny's entire first-class cricket career incorporated nine matches in four countries in 127 days. His highest score was 55 on debut against Zimbabwe at Bulawayo in November 1982.

References

External links
 

1951 births
2019 deaths
Alumni of Ananda College
Sri Lanka Test cricketers
Sri Lanka One Day International cricketers
Sri Lankan cricketers